Methylenecyclopropane is an organic compound with the formula . It is a hydrocarbon which, as the name suggests, is derived from the addition of a methylene substituent to a cyclopropane ring. It is a colourless, easily condensed gas that is used as a reagent in organic synthesis.

Synthesis
Methylenecyclopropane can be synthesised via an intramolecular cyclisation reaction from methallyl chloride by treatment with a strong base such as sodium amide.

Reactions
Being a strained and unsaturated molecule methylenecyclopropane undergoes many reactions, especially in the presence of metal catalysts.
For example, methylenecyclopropanes can be converted to cyclobutenes in the presence of a Platinum catalyst. This can be considered similar to the ring expansion seen in vinylcyclopropane rearrangements

Substituted methylenecyclopropanes can also be involved in trimethylenemethane cycloaddition reactions.

See also
 Methylenecyclopropene
 1-Methylcyclopropene
 Methylcyclopropane
 Cyclopropene

References

Cyclopropanes
Vinylidene compounds